Horizons is the second studio album by Australian metalcore band Parkway Drive. It was released on 6 October 2007 through Resist and Epitaph Records, and was produced by Adam Dutkiewicz. It was recorded in Westfield, Massachusetts at Zing Studios in May 2007. The record was a surprising commercial success for the band at the time, charting at #6 on the ARIA Album Charts, a notable achievement for an Australian metal band in 2007.

Recording
Recording took place at Zing Studios, Westfield, Massachusetts in the United States in May 2007. Adam Dutkiewicz of Killswitch Engage acted as producer. Discussing the recording process, McCall explained: "The songs, the sounds, the speed, the heaviness and the production has all been stepped up. Working with Adam again made our job super easy as well as highly enjoyable."

Composition
The track "Feed Them to the Pigs" is named after a line in the Guy Ritchie film Snatch. "Dead Man's Chest" takes its title after the film Pirates of the Caribbean: Dead Man's Chest.

Release and promotion
In July and August 2007, Parkway Drive appeared on that year's Warped Tour in the US. On 24 July 2007, Horizons was announced for release, and its track listing was revealed. On 20 August, "Boneyards" was posted on the band's Myspace profile. Horizons was made available for streaming on 1 October, and was released on 6 October through Epitaph. In October, the band toured across Australia, before going on tour in Europe with Comeback Kid, Cancer Bats, the Warriors, and This Is Hell the following month. A music video for "Boneyards" was posted online on 23 November. In December, the band went on a west coast US tour alongside XDeathstarx. In January and February 2008, the band went on a US tour alongside Killswitch Engage, the Dillinger Escape Plan and Every Time I Die. Following this, the band performed at the Groezrock festival in Belgium, and went on an Australian tour with Have Heart, Antagonist and Break Even. In July and August, the band supported Darkest Hour on the Trash & Burn tour. During the tour, the band performed at Robot Mosh Fest. In February 2009, the band played a few shows in China. In April and May 2009, the band went on a tour of the US with Stick to Your Guns and MyChildren MyBride. The band appeared at The Bamboozle and West coast Riot festivals in May and June 2009, respectively. After this, they performed at With Full Force festival in Germany in July 2009. They then toured Australia in August 2009, with support from August Burns Red and Architects. In September and October 2009, the band went on a US tour with A Day to Remember, In Fear and Faith and I See Stars.

Critical reception 

The album received mixed reviews from critics. AllMusic gave the album a positive review but saying, "As a result, Horizons is strictly by the book metalcore, but delivered with enough talent and passion to put across a set of songs that might easily come off as samey and dull in less capable hands."

Commercial performance 
It reached #6 on the ARIA Albums Chart on 14 October 2007 and #27 on the US Top Heatseekers chart.

Track listing

Personnel 
Credits are adapted from the album liner notes.

Parkway Drive
 Winston McCall – lead vocals
 Jeff Ling – lead guitar
 Luke "Pig" Kilpatrick – rhythm guitar
 Jia "Pie" O'Connor – bass
 Ben "Gaz" Gordon – drums

Additional musicians
 Slo-Han Tu-Dix – guitar solo on "Breaking Point"
 Pete Abordi – guest vocals on "Dead Man's Chest"

Additional personnel
 Adam Dutkiewicz – production, engineering, mixing
 Tom Baker – mastering
 Jim "Labs" Fogarty – assistant engineering
 Switzerland Design – art direction, design
 Gordon Ball – cover art, photography
 Ben Pobjoy – photography
 Glennie Whittall – illustration

Charts

Certifications

References

External links 
 
 Horizons at Epitaph Records

2007 albums
Albums produced by Adam Dutkiewicz
Epitaph Records albums
Parkway Drive albums
Resist Records albums